Günter Kutowski (born 2 August 1965) is a German retired professional footballer who played as a defender.

Career
Born in Paderborn, Kutowski joined Borussia Dortmund in 1984 at the age of 19, arriving from local amateurs 1. FC Paderborn. He made his Bundesliga debut on 2 March 1985 in a 1–1 home draw against Bayern Munich, and finished his first season with 16 complete matches as the club ranked in 14th position and avoided relegation by just one point.

In eight of the following 11 years, Kutowski was an automatic first-choice for the Black and Yellow, scoring his first goal in the top division on 10 August 1985 in a 1–1 draw at 1. FC Saarbrucken. In the 1992–93 campaign he appeared in 40 official games, including eight in the team's runner-up run in the UEFA Cup.

Kutowski left Borussia in 1996, joining lower league side TuS Paderborn-Neuhaus. His last stop as a professional came in 1996–97, as he played a few matches with Rot-Weiss Essen who ultimately suffered relegation from the 2. Bundesliga; he retired altogether at 36, and subsequently became a player's agent.

Honours
Borussia Dortmund
Bundesliga: 1994–95, 1995–96
DFL-Supercup: 1989, 1996
DFB-Pokal: 1988–89
UEFA Cup: runner-up 1992–93

References

External links

1965 births
Living people
Sportspeople from Paderborn
Footballers from North Rhine-Westphalia
German footballers
Association football defenders
Bundesliga players
2. Bundesliga players
Borussia Dortmund players
Borussia Dortmund II players
Rot-Weiss Essen players
SC Paderborn 07 players